The Jackals were a Serbian paramilitary group that operated during the Kosovo War 1999.

Ćuška massacre

Nine members of the group were arrested on March 13, 2010 on suspicion of having committed war crimes in Ćuška on May 14, 1999. A trial in Belgrade started on 20 December 2010. The trial included:
 Srećko Popović
 Slaviša Kastratović
 Boban Bogićević
 Radoslav Brnović
 Vidoje Korićanin
 Veljko Korićanin
 Abdulah Sokić

They are accused of committing murders, rapes and robberies in an "extremely brutal" way, with "the main goal to spread fear among Albanian civilians in order to force them to leave their homes and flee to Albania." Hasan Çeku, father of former Kosovo prime minister and wartime commander of the KLA, Agim Çeku, as well as several members of his family were among the murdered people.

The leader, Nebojša Minić, was arrested in Argentina in 2005 under a warrant of the Hague Tribunal, but died shortly of AIDS after the arrest.

Zoran Obradović was arrested in Germany on 25 December 2010.

Milojko Nikolić, nickname Šumadija, was arrested on 28 December 2010 in Montenegro.

See also
 Serbia in the Yugoslav Wars
 Agim Çeku

References

Paramilitary organizations based in Serbia
Serbian war crimes in the Kosovo War
Anti-Albanian sentiment